Shelby County is a county located in the U.S. state of Kentucky. As of the 2020 census, the population was 48,065. Its county seat is Shelbyville. The county was established in 1792 and named for Isaac Shelby, the first Governor of Kentucky.
Shelby County is part of the Louisville/Jefferson County, KY–IN Metropolitan Statistical Area. Shelby County's motto is "Good Land, Good Living, Good People".

History
Shelby County was founded in 1792 from land given by Jefferson County.

Founding families
One of the earliest families to settle in Shelby County was that of Daniel Ketcham of Washington County, Maryland. Ketcham, who arrived in 1784, had been a soldier in the American Revolution. He had 9 children. His oldest, John Ketcham, moved to Indiana, become involved in politics, and laid the groundwork for the creation of Indiana University.

Another early settler was Thomas Mitchell, who also moved to Shelby County in 1784. Mitchell was born on December 16, 1777, in Augusta County, Virginia. He married Rebecca Ketcham, daughter of Daniel Ketcham, and settled near the headwaters of South Fork Clear Creek (or Mulberry Creek). Mitchell was commissioned an ensign in the 18th Regiment of Militia and on January 4, 1801, Governor James Garrard became a captain in the 18th Regiment. Mitchell was a minister of the Methodist Church and served in the War of 1812.

Sale of alcohol
Shelby County was historically a prohibition or completely dry county, but the city of Shelbyville is now wet (i.e., allows retail alcohol sales), and the county has voted wet and now allows package sales (7 days a week) and restaurants outside Shelbyville to sell alcoholic beverages by the drink if they seat at least 100 patrons and derive at least 70% of their total sales from food. Today, Shelby County is officially classified by the Kentucky Office of Alcoholic Beverage Control as a wet county.

Geography
Guist Creek Lake and Marina offers 325 acres of fishing.

Adjacent counties
 Henry County  (north)
 Franklin County  (east)
 Anderson County  (southeast)
 Spencer County  (southwest)
 Jefferson County  (west)
 Oldham County  (northwest)

Major highways

Demographics

As of the census of 2000, there were 33,337 people, 12,104 households, and 9,126 families residing in the county. The racial makeup of the county was 86.61% White, 8.83% Black or African American, 0.30% Native American, 0.40% Asian, 0.12% Pacific Islander, 2.39% from other races, and 1.34% from two or more races.  4.51% of the population were Hispanic or Latino of any race.

There were 12,104 households, out of which 34.70% had children under the age of 18 living with them, 61.00% were married couples living together, 10.60% had a female householder with no husband present, and 24.60% were non-families. 20.20% of all households were made up of individuals, and 8.00% had someone living alone who was 65 years of age or older.  The average household size was 2.63 and the average family size was 3.00.

The age distribution was 25.20% under the age of 18, 8.70% from 18 to 24, 31.40% from 25 to 44, 24.00% from 45 to 64, and 10.80% who were 65 years of age or older.  The median age was 36 years. For every 100 females, there were 94.90 males.  For every 100 females age 18 and over, there were 91.30 males.

The median income for a household in the county was $45,534, and the median income for a family was $52,764. Males had a median income of $35,484 versus $25,492 for females. The per capita income for the county was $20,195.  About 6.50% of families and 9.90% of the population were below the poverty line, including 11.70% of those under age 18 and 12.30% of those age 65 or over.

Education
School districts in Shelby County include:
 Shelby County Public Schools
 Eminence Independent School District

Shelby County Public Schools
Shelby County Public Schools has six elementary schools, two middle schools, and two high schools. Dr. Sally Sugg is the Superintendent of Schools.

Schools located in Shelby County include:

Elementary Schools
 Clear Creek Elementary School
 Heritage Elementary School
 Marnel C. Moorman School
 Painted Stone Elementary School
 Simpsonville Elementary School
 Southside Elementary School
 Wright Elementary School

Middle Schools
 Marnel C. Moorman School
 Shelby County East Middle School
 Shelby County West Middle School

High Schools:
 Martha Layne Collins High School
 Shelby County High School

Shelby County Public Library
The Shelby County Public Library, built in 1903, is one of few Carnegie libraries still functioning as a public library in Kentucky. Pamela W. Federspiel is the Executive Director.

Communities

 Bagdad
 Chestnut Grove
 Christianburg
  Clark
 Clay Village
 Cropper
 Finchville
 Harrisonville
 Hemp Ridge
 Mt. Eden
 Mulberry
 Olive Branch
 Peytona
 Pleasureville
 Shelbyville (county seat)
 Simpsonville
 Southville
 Todds Point
 Waddy

Politics
The County Judge/Executive is Dan Ison.

See also

 Wet county
 Louisville–Elizabethtown–Scottsburg, KY–IN Combined Statistical Area
 National Register of Historic Places listings in Shelby County, Kentucky
 Outlet Shoppes of the Bluegrass

Resources
 "Excerpts from the Executive Journal of Governor James Garrad," Kentucky Historical Society Register, vol. 32, p. 133.
 Woodfill, Gabriel, "A Preacher of the Gospel," Marriage Bonds of Shelby County - 1792–1800, Kentucky Marriage Records: From the Register of the Kentucky Historical Society, Baltimore 1983, p. 693.
 Willis, George L. Sr., History of Shelby County Kentucky, Shelbyville 1929, p. 115.

References

External links
 Visit Shelby County!
 Shelby County government
 Shelby County public schools

 
Kentucky counties
Louisville metropolitan area
1792 establishments in Kentucky
Populated places established in 1792